The Panasonic Lumix DMC-GH2 is a digital camera with HD video recording capability that is part of the Micro Four Thirds system. Though commonly referred to as a DSLR (digital single-lens reflex) camera, it has no mirror or optical viewfinder, but has instead both a fold-out LCD screen and a (somewhat higher resolution) electronic viewfinder.

The DMC-GH2 can record video at up to HD 1080P at 24 fps. It is notable for offering 1080/50i and 60i (interlaced) recording modes (compatible with broadcasting) as well as 24p, but not 25p and 30p.

Background comparison 
The GH2 was released in October 2010 as a successor to the Panasonic Lumix DMC-GH1. The GH2 comes with a touch-screen display, a feature that was not present in the GH1.

The Micro Four Thirds system (with its crop factor of 2 when compared to 35 mm still) does not offer the degree of shallow-focus effects possible with full-frame cameras.

Micro Four Thirds has the same sensor size as the Four Thirds System but replaces the complex optical path needed for the optical viewfinder with an electronic viewfinder displaying a live view; this allows for smaller and lighter lenses and bodies. Like the GH1, the electronic viewfinder (EVF) in the GH2 uses a sophisticated projection system to achieve a clearer, smoother display than that of compact camera EVFs.

As with the GH1, it lacks a separate autofocus (AF) sensor; the GH2 uses contrast-detect autofocus using the readout from the main sensor. HD video mode also uses this purpose-designed contrast-detect AF system. Just like the GH1, the GH2 supports continuous autofocusing while shooting video.

Features 
The Micro Four Thirds sensor has about a quarter the area of a 35 mm stills frame, giving a crop factor of about two, so that a "standard lens" may be regarded as around 25 mm focal length.  While the sensor is the same size as the Four Thirds system, the flange to sensor distance is much shorter, which as well as allowing small camera size, means that a great variety of camera lenses can be used with an appropriate adapter. In practice, the electronic focus, aperture control, and image stabilising may not work on an adapted lens, so use of an adapted lens is best considered on a case by case basis.

Optical image stabilisation is available on Panasonic MFT zoom lenses, and power zoom and power focus is available on some Panasonic X series lenses.

The camera has a dedicated video button and a stereo microphone.

The GH2's electronic viewfinder has been widened compared to the GH1's, increasing the number of dots to 1.53 million from the GH1's 1.44 million. The wider screen better accommodates the GH2's oversize multi-aspect ratio sensor. Use of this oversize sensor ensures that the user can take pictures in 3:2, 4:3 and 16:9 ratios without significant cropping — giving approximately 15.1 MP, 15.9 MP and 13.9MP respectively, compared to the 14.2 MP, 15.9 MP and 11.8 MP that would result from using a "traditional" sensor.
An external stereo microphone socket is provided, which, unusually, is 2.5 mm and not the standard 3.5 mm. Manual levels can be set in four stages (6 dB increments).

The camera is available in two colors — black (model suffix K) and gray (model suffix S).

Video
Recording is to a SDHC or SDXC flash memory card in AVCHD or M-JPEG format, giving up to high quality HD 1080P video at 24 fps with up to 2 hours per take on the USA or Canadian versions (for the European version it's 30 minutes per take maximum due to a European tax on video cameras). The GH2 is also notable for offering 1080/50i and 60i (interlaced) recording modes (compatible with broadcasting) as well as 24p, though 25p and 30p are not supported.

Compatible lenses 
The Panasonic GH2 is compatible with the full range of  Micro Four Thirds system lenses including:

Wide-angle lens
Panasonic Lumix G Vario      7–14 mm ƒ/4,0

Standard lens
Panasonic Lumix G           14–42 mm ƒ/3.5-5.6 Aspheric O.I.S.
Panasonic Lumix GX Vario PZ 14–42 mm ƒ/3.5-5.6 Aspheric Power O.I.S.
Panasonic Lumix G Vario     14–45 mm ƒ/3.5–5.6 lens O.I.S. (28–90 mm equivalent)

Telephoto lens
Panasonic Lumix GX Vario PZ 45-175mm ƒ/4-5.6 Aspheric Power O.I.S.
Panasonic Lumix G Vario     45–200 mm ƒ/4–5.6 lens (90–400 mm equivalent)
Panasonic Lumix G HD       100–300 mm f/4,0-5,6 O.I.S.

Super-Zoom
Panasonic Lumic G Vario HD  14–140 mm ƒ4.0–5.8 (28–280 mm equivalent)

Prime lens
Panasonic Lumix G           8 mm ƒ/3.5 fisheye lens with a 180° field of view. Lenses support optical image
Panasonic Lumix G           20 mm "pancake" ƒ1.7  (no image stabiliser) (manual focus slips; no end stops)
Noktor Hyperprime 50mm 0.95 lens (announced February 2010) (35 mm EFL = 100 mm) SLR Magic was recently tapped as a new producer of this lens as of May 2011 making it the SLR Magic Hyperprime 50mm F0.95 lens
 SLR Magic Hyperprime 12mm 1.6 lens (35 mm EFL = 24 mm) (announced November 2011)
 SLR Magic 35mm f/1.7 lens 1.7 (announced August 2009) (35 mm EFL = 70 mm)
 Toy Lens 11mm f/1.4 lens 1.4 (announced May 2011) (35 mm EFL = 22 mm)
 Toy Lens 26mm f/1.4 lens 1.4 (announced December 2010) (35 mm EFL = 52 mm)
Cosina Voigtländer 25 mm f/0.95 (exceptionally "fast") (no image stabiliser)
Cosina Voigtländer  17.5 mm f/0.95 (exceptionally "fast") (no image stabiliser)

3D lens
Panasonic Lumix G 3D lens   12.5 mm / F12 (H-FT012)

Various official mount adapters are available
Four Thirds System lenses (Four variations of this adapter exist.)
OM lenses (fully manual) — MF-2
Leica M mount lenses (fully manual) — DMW-MA2M
Leica R mount lenses (fully manual) — DMW-MA3R
Cosina Voigtländer VM mount lenses (fully manual) — VM Adapter
Carl Zeiss ZM mount lenses (fully manual) — VM Adapter
Cosina Voigtländer Ai-S mount lenses (fully manual) — Voigtländer F Adapter
Carl Zeiss ZF mount lenses (fully manual) — Voigtländer F Adapter
Cosina Voigtländer PK-A/R, KA mount lenses (fully manual) — Voigtländer K Adapter
Carl Zeiss ZK mount lenses (fully manual) — Voigtländer K Adapter

Many unofficial adapters allow mounting of additional lenses
Nikon 50 mm  AF Nikkor f1.4 (100 mm full-frame equivalent; no image stabiliser; fully manual; solid focus with end stops)

Firmware updates

Panasonic releases 
Panasonic released firmware version 1.1 in October 2011, with a "compatibility update for new Panasonic X class lenses with power zoom (PZ) feature" which enabled the following with them: display of the local length, step zoom, zoom resume, and selectable zoom speed; and a number of other new features and improvements.

Third-party firmware modifications (hacks) 
Non-Panasonic modifications to the camera's firmware, often referred to as hacks, have been developed and posted on the Internet. The firmware modifications offer the following functionality:
Higher bitrate for video, which improves image detail & motion quality.
Ability to adjust the allocation of bitrate to motion quality versus image detail quality.
Higher bitrates for audio, 192 kbit/s to 440 kbit/s
Pal & 25p framerates
Unlocked ISO up to 12,800 enables shooting in extremely dark conditions or overcome a slow lens

Reportedly, these firmware modifications do not enhance still shots from the camera, although it has been reported there is the possibility that a future firmware release could enhance stills features and performance.

Modifying a camera with third party firmware is potentially risky. An incorrect application of the third party firmware could render the camera inoperative.  There have been anecdotal reports from Panasonic of modified cameras being returned with damaged processors.

One such third-party firmware modification is PTool.

Video recording formats

AVCHD format (.MTS files)

M-JPEG format (.MOV files)

References

External links 

Panasonic Lumix DMC-GH2 site
Panasonic Lumix DMC-GH2 Press Release
Panasonic Lumix DMC-GH2 Review — dpreview.com
Panasonic Lumix DMC-GH2 Review — imaging-resource.com
Panasonic Lumix DMC-GH2 Review — photographyblog.com
Announcement

GH2